Scythris passerini is a moth of the family Scythrididae. It was described by Bengt Å. Bengtsson in 1997. It is found in Iran, Libya and Syria.

References

passerini
Moths described in 1997